Science and Technology Park is a technology park in Longhua Town, Shenzhen, in the south of China, that is Foxconn's largest factory site worldwide. It gained notoriety in 2010 after a spate of suicide attempts, many of them successful, by employees at the Foxconn facilities in the area, totaling 15 attempts that year, 10-13 of which were fatal.

The park produces the bulk of Apple's iPhone line. Hundreds of thousands of workers (varying counts include 230,000, 300,000, and 450,000) are employed at the site, a walled campus sometimes referred to as “Foxconn City”. While some workers live in surrounding towns and villages, others live and work inside the complex; a quarter of the employees live in the dormitories, and many of them work up to 12 hours a day for 6 days each week.

References 

Industrial parks in China
Buildings and structures in Shenzhen
Foxconn
Longhua District, Shenzhen